Kay Wolf (born October 8, 1949) is a former Republican member of the Kansas Senate, representing the 7th district from 2013 until she announced her retirement in 2016 and was replaced by Barbara Bollier in 2017. Previously, she served in the Kansas House of Representatives, representing the 21st district, from her appointment on August 8, 2005, until 2013.

Prior to her appointment Kay served on the Prairie Village City Council and was the director of client services for Haren Laughlin Construction.  She is member of the Johnson County Library Foundation and sits on the board of directors of Temporary Lodging for Children and Families.

Committee membership
 Taxation
 Vision 2020
 Veterans, Military and Homeland Security
 Judiciary
 Joint Committee on State-Tribal Relations

Major donors
The top 5 donors to Wolf's 2008 campaign were mainly professional organizations:
1. Kansas Contractors Assoc 	$1,000 	
2. Stewart, Jon L 	$1,000 
3. Kansas Bankers Assoc 	$850 	
4. Kansas Optometric Assoc 	$750 	
5. Kansas Hospital Assoc 	$750

References

External links
 Official Campaign Website
 Kansas Legislature - Kay Wolf
 Project Vote Smart profile
 Kansas Votes profile
 Follow the Money campaign contributions:
 2006, 2008

Republican Party members of the Kansas House of Representatives
Living people
Women state legislators in Kansas
People from Prairie Village, Kansas
Kansas city council members
1949 births
Women city councillors in Kansas
21st-century American politicians
21st-century American women politicians
Republican Party Kansas state senators